The 1953 Houston Cougars baseball team represented the University of Houston during the 1953 NCAA baseball season. The team won the Missouri Valley Conference regular season championship, and advanced to participate in the College World Series. It was Houston's first appearance in the College World Series. The team was coached by fourth-year head coach Lovette Hill, and played its home games at Cougar Field.

Showing a sluggish start to the season, Houston lost six out of their first seven games, but then went on a seven-game winning streak that eventually propelled the team to a conference championship.

Roster

Schedule 

! style="background:#CC0000;color:white;"| Regular Season
|-

|- align="center" bgcolor="#ffdddd"
| March 9 || vs.  || 3–4 || 0–1 || –
|- align="center" bgcolor="#ffdddd"
| March 10 || vs. Baylor || 6–11 || 0–2 || –
|- align="center" bgcolor="#ffdddd"
| March 13 || vs.  || 2–4 || 0–3 || –
|- align="center" bgcolor="#ddffdd"
| March 18 || vs.  || 12–2 || 1–3 || –
|- align="center" bgcolor="#ffdddd"
| March 23 || vs.  || 3–5 || 1–4 || –
|- align="center" bgcolor="#ffdddd"
| March 25 || vs.  || 2–6 || 1–5 || –
|- align="center" bgcolor="#ffdddd"
| March 26 || vs. Minnesota || 4–5 || 1–6 || –
|- align="center" bgcolor="#ddffdd"
| April 2 || vs.  || 5–4 || 2–6 || –
|- align="center" bgcolor="#ddffdd"
| April 3 || vs. Louisiana || 13–6 || 3–6 || –
|- align="center" bgcolor="#ddffdd"
| April 4 || vs. Louisiana || 7–4 || 4–6 || –
|- align="center" bgcolor="#ddffdd"
| April 10 || vs.  || 10–3 || 5–6 || 1–0
|- align="center" bgcolor="#ddffdd"
| April 10 || vs. Wichita State || 9–4 || 6–6 || 2–0
|- align="center" bgcolor="#ddffdd"
| April 14 || vs. Lamar || 6–4 || 7–6 || –
|- align="center" bgcolor="#ddffdd"
| April 20 || vs. Sam Houston State || 10–7 || 8–6 || –
|- align="center" bgcolor="#ffdddd"
| May 1 || vs.  || 6–8 || 8–7 || 2–1
|- align="center" bgcolor="#ddffdd"
| May 2 || vs. Tulsa|| 18–14 || 9–7 || 3–1
|- align="center" bgcolor="#ffdddd"
| May 8 || vs.  || 4–6 || 9–8 || 3–2
|- align="center" bgcolor="#ddffdd"
| May 9 || vs. Oklahoma State || 3–2 || 10–8 || 4–2
|- align="center" bgcolor="#ddffdd"
| May 12 || vs. Texas A&M || 3–2 || 11–8 || –
|- align="center" bgcolor="#ddffdd"
| May 22|| vs.  || 6–3 || 12–8 || 5–2
|- align="center" bgcolor="#ddffdd"
| May 22 || vs. Detroit || 10–2 || 13–8 || 6–2
|-

|-
! style="background:#CC0000;color:#FFFFFF;"| Postseason
|-

|- align="center" bgcolor="#ffdddd"
| May 26|| vs.  || 4–7 || 13–9
|- align="center" bgcolor="#ddffdd"
| May 27 || vs. Oklahoma || 8–7 || 14–9
|- align="center" bgcolor="#ddffdd"
| May 27 || vs. Oklahoma || 5–3 || 15–9
|-

|- align="center" bgcolor="#ffdddd"
| June 11 || vs. Boston College || Rosenblatt Stadium || 1–4 || 15–10
|- align="center" bgcolor="#ffdddd"
| June 12 || vs. Stanford || Rosenblatt Stadium || 6–7 || 15–11
|-

References 

Houston
Houston Cougars baseball seasons
College World Series seasons
Missouri Valley Conference baseball champion seasons
Houston Cougars base